Bruno Fernandes Andrade de Brito (born 2 March 1989) is a Brazilian professional footballer who plays as a forward for Hoofdklasse club Halsteren.

Career
Born in São Bernardo do Campo, Andrade began his senior career in 2007 with PAEC. In February 2008 he was loaned out to Italian side Reggina, and spent the entire 2008-09 season on loan at Dutch team Helmond Sport. After the loan spell ended, Helmond made the deal permanent. On 20 December 2010, Andrade was linked with Italian Serie B club Atalanta.

On 29 January 2017 Andrade signed to Hapoel Kfar Saba until the end of the season.

Ahead of the 2019–20 season, Andrade joined Belgian club KFC Esperanza Pelt.

On 19 June 2020, Andrade signed with RKSV Halsteren competing in the Hoofdklasse.

References

External links
 
 

1989 births
Living people
Brazilian footballers
Brazilian expatriate footballers
Grêmio Osasco Audax Esporte Clube players
Helmond Sport players
Willem II (football club) players
Go Ahead Eagles players
Sint-Truidense V.V. players
San Marcos de Arica footballers
Reggina 1914 players
Hapoel Kfar Saba F.C. players
Serie A players
Eredivisie players
Eerste Divisie players
Primera B de Chile players
Belgian Pro League players
Challenger Pro League players
Israeli Premier League players
Vierde Divisie players
Expatriate footballers in the Netherlands
Brazilian expatriate sportspeople in the Netherlands
Expatriate footballers in Belgium
Brazilian expatriate sportspeople in Belgium
Expatriate footballers in Italy
Brazilian expatriate sportspeople in Italy
Expatriate footballers in Chile
Brazilian expatriate sportspeople in Chile
Expatriate footballers in Israel
Brazilian expatriate sportspeople in Israel
Association football forwards
RKSV Halsteren players
People from São Bernardo do Campo
Footballers from São Paulo (state)